Taybeh    is a village in the  Baalbek District in Baalbek-Hermel Governorate.

History
In 1838, Eli Smith noted  el-Taiyibeh as a village in the Baalbek area, whose inhabitants were  Catholic.

In popular culture 
The 2011 Lebanese film Where Do We Go Now? directed by Nadine Labaki was partly shot in the village because it features a church next to a mosque, as in the plot of the movie.

References

Bibliography

External links
Taybeh,  Localiban

Populated places in Baalbek District